Anastasiya Viktorovna Zubkova (Анастасия Викторовна Зубкова, born 3 February 1980) is a Russian female water polo player. She was a member of the Russia women's national water polo team. She was a part of the  team at the 2004 Summer Olympics. On club level she played for Uralochka Zlatoust in Russia.

She is the twin sister of water polo player Anna Zubkova, who competed for the Kazakhstan national team at the 2004 Olympics.

See also
 List of World Aquatics Championships medalists in water polo

References

External links
 

1980 births
Living people
Russian female water polo players
Water polo players at the 2004 Summer Olympics
Olympic water polo players of Russia
Sportspeople from Chelyabinsk
Twin sportspeople
21st-century Russian women